The Gay House was a historic Queen Anne style house in Montgomery, Alabama.  The two-story frame building was built by the Hugger Brothers Construction Company in 1900 for Charles Linn Gay.  Gay, born on November 8, 1862, was a Montgomery businessman.  He died on July 4, 1928.  The house was added to the National Register of Historic Places on  March 15, 1975.  It was mostly destroyed by fire in October 2007 and the remnants were sold for architectural salvage in July 2011.

References

Houses on the National Register of Historic Places in Alabama
Queen Anne architecture in Alabama
Houses completed in 1900
National Register of Historic Places in Montgomery, Alabama
Houses in Montgomery, Alabama
Demolished buildings and structures in Alabama
1900 establishments in Alabama